Mammoth is a 2006 American science fiction comedy horror television film directed, co-written, and co-executive produced by Tim Cox. The film stars Vincent Ventresca, Summer Glau, Leila Arcieri, Cole Williams, and Tom Skerritt.

Plot
Frank Abernathy is the curator of the natural history museum in Blackwater, Louisiana. He is a widower who doesn't seem to have time for his daughter, Jack. Frank's father, Simon, is a B-movie enthusiast who believes in extraterrestrials and shows his favorite movies at the local theater. The city loses its electrical power just as Simon, Jack and her boyfriend Squirrelly exit the theater. They watch an object streaking through the sky and crashing into the museum. Thought to be a meteorite, they later find out it is a craft containing an alien lifeform. Trying to adapt to the Earth's atmosphere, it latches on to the first organism it finds - the museum's most notable exhibit, a frozen Wooly mammoth.

A security guard witnesses the revival of the prehistoric elephant, which kills the guard. With the creature on the loose, two government agents, Powers and Whitaker, track Frank down. While the agents and Frank try to figure out what happened and what to do, the mammoth heads into the forest, where it kills anyone it comes across. The beast's path soon brings it to a huge party attended by Jack and Squirrelly.

They survive the attack and meet up with Frank and the agents. The mammoth suddenly appears and kills Agent Whitaker while Agent Powers, Frank, Jack and Squirrelly escape. While the mammoth continues its rampage around the town, the government is preparing to detonate a nuclear bomb on the alien-possessed elephant. The group must find a way to take the creature down without destroying their town.

After devising a plan to stop the mammoth, Frank, Powers, Jack and Squirrelly are joined by Simon and town sheriff Marion Morrison at the local factory to encase the creature in ice, just like it was before. While en route, Squirrelly is killed by the mammoth, but the plan moves forward at full speed. The mammoth arrives at the factory, and is doused in molten steel. It then slaughters Sheriff Morrison, off screen. They figure out that liquid nitrogen is the only way to stop the mammoth once and for all. The mammoth is lured into the liquid nitrogen trap. Frank, Jack, and Powers, among other survivors, escape as Simon sacrifices himself to pull the release valve and smash the controls, forcing the liquid nitrogen to spray out and freeze both Simon and the mammoth.

The movie ends as Simon's frozen body is put in government hands, and the refrozen mammoth is put back out as an exhibit.

Cast
 Vincent Ventresca as Frank Abernathy
 Constantin Drăgănescu as Gordon
 Summer Glau as Jack Abernathy
 Tom Skerritt as Simon Abernathy
 Cole Williams as Squirrelly
 Charles Carroll as Sheriff Marion Morrison
 Mark Irvingsen as Deputy Dino
 David Kallaway as Deputy Bud
 Leila Arcieri as Agent Powers
 Marcus Lyle Brown as Agent Whitaker
 Andrew Peter Marin as Floyd
 Dan Radulescu as Moe the Monkey Man
 Karen Parden Johnson as Gas Station Lady
 Coca Bloos as Olive
 Boris Petroff as Bruno
 Julia Lashae as Tour Guide

Awards and nominations

References

External links
 
 

2006 films
2006 comedy horror films
2006 science fiction films
2006 television films
2000s monster movies
2000s science fiction comedy films
2000s science fiction horror films
American comedy horror films
American horror television films
American monster movies
American science fiction comedy films
American science fiction horror films
American science fiction television films
Films about father–daughter relationships
Films about father–son relationships
Films about elephants
Films set in Louisiana
Films set in museums
Films shot in Bucharest
Films shot in Louisiana
Adventure horror films
Adventure television films
Syfy original films
American drama television films
2000s English-language films
Films directed by Tim Cox
2000s American films